The Castel Morrone donkey or Castel Morrone ass is an extinct or nearly extinct breed of donkey from the area of Castel Morrone in the province of Caserta in the Italian region of Campania. Muscular and broad-backed, the animal was widely used as a means of transport in the stony hills of the district around Castel Morrone, as well as a beast of burden. It is or was characterised by large ears, a large-ish head, long hooves, and a blackish-grey coat with tawny markings around the eyes.

References

Donkey breeds originating in Italy
Province of Caserta
Donkey breeds